Gamma Iota Sigma is a collegiate professional fraternity, founded on April 16, 1966 at Ohio State University, Columbus, Ohio.

Gamma Iota Sigma is an international professional fraternity organized to promote, encourage and sustain student interest in insurance, risk management and actuarial science as professions. It aims to encourage high moral and scholastic attainments and to facilitate the interaction and cooperation of educational institutions, industry, and professional organizations by fostering research, scholarship, and improved public relations.

The Fraternity was designed to be "the insurance industry's premier collegiate talent pipeline."

Mission
From inception, the Fraternity has explained its Mission as follows:
Gamma Iota Sigma fulfills a mission of promoting and sustaining student interest in careers in insurance, risk management, and actuarial science.

The methods used in the achievement of this mission are stated: Through world-class programs, innovative partnerships, critical industry support, expansive campus engagement, and an unrivaled lifelong professional network, Gamma Iota Sigma leads the sustainable growth and diversification of the insurance industry’s student talent pipeline across all functional areas.

History
The idea of a national scholastic insurance fraternity actually started to become a reality when the Griffith Foundation for Insurance Education filed for incorporation in 1965.  The following year, the OSU Insurance Society, which started at The Ohio State University in the early 1960s, petitioned and was chartered as the first Gamma Iota Sigma Chapter, thereafter called Alpha chapter.  At Bowling Green State University, Beta chapter received its charter in 1967, and in 1969, the University of Cincinnati was chartered as Gamma chapter.  This was the beginning of a fraternity with 100 chapters located from California to Washington, D.C., and from Canada to Florida.

In October 2001 with the chartering of its 41st chapter at Fanshawe College, London Ontario, Canada, Gamma Iota Sigma became an international fraternity.

A Grand Chapter or Executive Committee of Gamma Iota Sigma was formed from the original fraternity planning committee, appointed by the Griffith Foundation.

The first Grand Chapter President was Warren L. Weeks, then a Griffith Foundation trustee.  It was his commitment to the concept of a national student organization that lead to the eventual formation of Gamma Iota Sigma.  (There currently exists a Warren L. Weeks, Sr. Scholarship presented each year to a student member.  Nominations for the award are made by local chapters.)

Symbols
Gamma Iota Sigma Emblem
The Emblem is a shield in the shape of an inverted triangle. Inside a narrow border are Greek letters for Gamma Iota Sigma. Each of the three sides symbolizes three of four fraternal ideals.

Gamma Iota Sigma Coat of Arms
The Coat of Arms for Gamma Iota Sigma is in the shape of what is known as a fire mark. Fire marks were made of iron and placed on the exterior of the buildings on insured properties so as to identify the specific fire company that, in the event of a fire, would serve to extinguish it. The fire mark is decorated with the symbol of the four clasped right hands. Each hand is representative of one of the four ideals upon which the fraternity is based: friendship, knowledge, integrity, and fidelity. Beneath clasped hands are the Greek letters for Gamma Iota Sigma.

Chapters
The chapters of Gamma Iota Sigma are as follows:
ALPHA (The Ohio State University, 1966)
BETA (Bowling Green State University, 1967)
GAMMA (University of Cincinnati, 1969)
DELTA* (Orange Coast College (CA), 1970)
EPSILON (University of Alabama, 1972)
ZETA (Georgia State University, 1973)
ETA (University of Georgia, 1975)
THETA* (Louisiana State University, 1975)
IOTA (Florida State University, 1975)
KAPPA (Arizona State University, 1975)
LAMBDA (University of South Carolina, 1976)
MU (University of Mississippi, 1976)
NU (Central Michigan University, 1977)
XI (University of Connecticut-Storrs, 1978)
OMICRON* (Arkansas State University, 1978)
PI (Mississippi State University, 1978)
RHO (Appalachian State University, 1979)
SIGMA (Temple University, 1980)
TAU (Howard University, 1981)
UPSILON (Ferris State University, 1981) (reactivated in 2013)
PHI (Ball State University, 1982)
CHI (Drake University, 1982)
PSI (Eastern Kentucky University, 1983)
OMEGA (Middle Tennessee State University, 1984)
ALPHA ALPHA (Olivet College, 1986)
ALPHA BETA* (Pennsylvania State University, 1989)
ALPHA GAMMA* (University of Pennsylvania, 1989)
ALPHA DELTA (La Salle University, 1989)
ALPHA EPSILON (Indiana State University, 1990)
ALPHA ZETA* (The University of Memphis, 1991)
ALPHA ETA (California State University, Sacramento, 1991)
ALPHA THETA* (St. Cloud State University, 1991)
ALPHA IOTA (St. John's University, 1991)
ALPHA KAPPA (Illinois State University, 1991)
ALPHA LAMBDA (Missouri State University, 1993)
ALPHA MU (Virginia Commonwealth University, 1994)
ALPHA NU (Ohio University, 1996)
ALPHA XI (Morgan State University, 1998)
ALPHA OMICRON (University of Hartford, 1999)
ALPHA PI (Baylor University, 2001)
ALPHA RHO* (Fanshawe College (Canada), 2001)
ALPHA SIGMA* (University of Louisiana at Monroe, 2001)
ALPHA TAU (University of North Carolina at Charlotte, 2003)
ALPHA UPSILON (University of Houston, 2003)
ALPHA PHI (Old Dominion University, 2003)
ALPHA CHI (Bradley University, 2004)
ALPHA PSI (University of Central Arkansas, 2005)
ALPHA OMEGA (Saint Joseph's University, 2006)
BETA ALPHA (University of Iowa, 2007)
BETA BETA (New Mexico State University, 2007)
BETA GAMMA (California State University-Fullerton, 2008)
BETA DELTA* (Utica College, 2008)
BETA EPSILON (University of Central Oklahoma, 2008)
BETA ZETA (University of North Texas, 2012)
BETA ETA (Northern Michigan University, 2013)
BETA THETA (East Carolina University, 2013)
BETA IOTA (Troy University, 2013)
BETA KAPPA (University of Houston–Downtown, 2014)
BETA LAMBDA (Butler University, 2014)
BETA MU (University of Colorado DENVER, 2014)
BETA NU (Kent State University, 2014)
BETA XI (St. Mary's University, Texas, 2014)
BETA OMICRON* (Columbia University, 2014)
BETA PI (University of St. Thomas (Minnesota), 2015)
BETA RHO* (University of Wisconsin–Oshkosh, 2015)
BETA SIGMA (University of Southern Maine, 2015)
BETA TAU (University of Pittsburgh, 2016)
BETA UPSILON* (University of Hawaii–West Oahu, 2016)
BETA PHI (The University of Texas at Dallas, 2016)
BETA CHI (University of Massachusetts Amherst, 2016)
BETA PSI (University of Missouri, 2016)
BETA OMEGA (Ohio Dominican University, 2016)
GAMMA ALPHA (Gallaudet University, 2017)
GAMMA BETA (University of Akron, 2017)
GAMMA GAMMA (Iowa State University, 2017)
GAMMA DELTA (Northwood University, 2017)
GAMMA EPSILON (North Central College, 2018)
GAMMA ZETA (University of Texas at Austin, 2018)
GAMMA ETA (Mercer University, 2018)
GAMMA THETA (University of Texas at El Paso, 2018)
GAMMA IOTA (University of Nebraska-Lincoln, 2019)
GAMMA KAPPA (Mercyhurst University, 2019)
GAMMA LAMBDA (University of Illinois at Urbana-Champaign, 2019)
GAMMA MU (Lansing Community College, 2019)
GAMMA NU (Samford University, 2019)
GAMMA XI (Texas Christian University, 2019)
GAMMA OMICRON (University of Southern California, 2019)
GAMMA PI (University of Mount Union, 2019)
GAMMA RHO (Bentley University, 2020)
GAMMA SIGMA (University of Baltimore, 2020)
GAMMA TAU* (University of Louisiana at Lafayette, 2020)
GAMMA UPSILON (University of Minnesota, 2020)
GAMMA PHI (Utah Valley University, 2020)
GAMMA CHI (Slippery Rock University, 2021)
GAMMA PSI (University of Virginia, 2021)
GAMMA OMEGA (University of Wisconsin - Madison, 2022)
DELTA ALPHA (Northern Arizona University, 2022)
DELTA BETA (Florida State University, 2022)
DELTA GAMMA (DePauw University, 2022)
DELTA DELTA (Stillman College, 2022)
*Indicates Inactive Chapter

Executive committee

President - Carrie Busic, Westfield Insurance
Immediate Past President - Steve Marohn, CNA
Executive Vice President - Michael Klein, Travelers
Vice President - Brady Kelley, WSIA
Treasurer - Nick Abraham, Amwins Brokerage of Georgia, LLC
Secretary - Matt Heimstead, State Farm
Alumni Representative - Florent Ndindjock, Marsh
Faculty Representative - Jill Bisco Illinois State University and David Sommer St. Mary's University
International Student Representative - William Biernat of the Alpha Psi Chapter at the University of Central Arkansas
International Student Representative - Zane Smith of the Beta Xi Chapter at St. Mary's University 
Executive Director - Grace Grant, Gamma Iota Sigma

References

Student organizations established in 1966
Professional fraternities and sororities in the United States
1966 establishments in Ohio
Former members of Professional Fraternity Association